Ocean FM may refer to the following radio stations:

Ocean FM (Cayman Islands)
Ocean FM (Ireland)
Heart Hampshire, formerly Ocean FM (UK)